al-Attara is a Palestinian village in the Jenin Governorate in the Western area of the West Bank, located 15 kilometers Southwest of Jenin. According to the Palestinian Central Bureau of Statistics, the village had a population of 1,072 inhabitants in mid-year 2006.

History
Pottery sherds from the late Roman, Byzantine and early Islamic periods have been found here.

According to SWP: "This place is mentioned in the Onomasticon (s. v. Atharoth) as a city of Ephraim, north of Sebaste, and 4 miles from it. The distance is exact."

In Crusader sources it was called Lathara. 

In 1140, Ussama, a Moslem traveller, mentioned Al-Attara together with nearby Silat ad-Dhahr.

In 1178, it was attacked by Bedouin, but withstood the attack.

Ottoman era
Al-Attara, like all of Palestine, was incorporated into the Ottoman Empire in 1517.  About 10% of the pottery sherds found in the village date back to this period.  In the 1596 Ottoman tax registers, Al-Attara was listed as an entirely Muslim village called 'Attara, and had a population of 12 families and 2 bachelors. It was located in the nahiya of Jabal Sami in the liwa of Nablus. The inhabitants paid a fixed tax rate of 33,3% on agricultural products, including wheat, barley, summer crops, olive trees, and goats and/or beehives, in addition to occasional revenues and a tax on people from the Nablus area, a total of 5,000 akçe.

A fortress, dating from the 16th—17th century, is visible in the centre of the village.

In 1870, Victor Guérin noted it as a poor village, but one which had succeed an ancient place.

In 1882, the PEF's Survey of Western Palestine (SWP) described Al-Attara as  "A small stone village on a spur of mountain, with a few olives and a well on the west."

British Mandate era
In the 1922 census of Palestine conducted by the British Mandate authorities, Al-Attara had a population of 164 Muslims, increasing in the 1931 census to 193 Muslims, in 51 houses.

In the 1945 statistics,  the population of Al-Attara was 250 Muslims,  with 3,844   dunams of land according to an official land and population survey. Of this, 88 dunams were plantations and irrigable land, 1,784 were used for cereals, while 5 dunams were built-up (urban) land.

Jordanian era
After the 1948 Arab–Israeli War and the 1949 Armistice Agreements, Al-Attara came under Jordanian rule.

The Jordanian census of 1961 found 388 inhabitants in Al-Attara.

Post-1967
Since the Six-Day War in 1967, Al-Attara has been under Israeli occupation.

References

Bibliography

External links
Welcome To al-'Attara
Survey of Western Palestine, Map 11: IAA, Wikimedia commons 

Jenin Governorate
Villages in the West Bank
Municipalities of the State of Palestine